Ademar Aparecido Xavier Júnior (born 8 January 1985 in Arapongas), commonly known as Ademar Xavier, Xavier Ademar or simply Ademar, is a Brazilian footballer.

Club career
He started his career in 2001 as a junior for Londrina F.C. in Brazil. He was quickly selected to play for Brazil under 16's in 2001, in an international championship in France. Ademar also played for Vitória F.C. (Portugal) and Bulgarian Vihren Sandanski between 2005-2007. From 2008-2009 played for Rio Ave (Portugal), C.S. Buftea (Romania) and Gloria Buzău (Romania). Joined Xinabajul in September 2009. Between 2010 and 2013 he played at Moldovan side FC Milsami Orhei. Since 27 February 2014 he plays at FC Zimbru Chișinău.

International career
Played for Brazil in 2001 at the age of 16.

Personal life
Ademar is the cousin of fellow footballer Juninho.

Honours
Vitória de Setúbal
Liga de Honra
Runner-up : 2007/2008

Milsami Orhei
Moldovan Cup : 2011-12
Moldovan Super Cup : 2012–13

Zimbru Chișinău
Moldovan Cup : 2013-14

References

External links

 
 
 
 2007-08 Portuguese Liga Profile 

1985 births
Living people
People from Arapongas
Brazilian footballers
Association football midfielders
Londrina Esporte Clube players
Vitória F.C. players
OFC Vihren Sandanski players
Rio Ave F.C. players
LPS HD Clinceni players
FC Gloria Buzău players
FC Milsami Orhei players
Arapongas Esporte Clube players
FC Zimbru Chișinău players
FC Tiraspol players
Primeira Liga players
Liga II players
Liga I players
First Professional Football League (Bulgaria) players
Moldovan Super Liga players
Brazilian expatriate footballers
Expatriate footballers in Portugal
Expatriate footballers in Bulgaria
Expatriate footballers in Romania
Expatriate footballers in Guatemala
Expatriate footballers in Moldova
Brazilian expatriate sportspeople in Portugal
Brazilian expatriate sportspeople in Bulgaria
Brazilian expatriate sportspeople in Romania
Brazilian expatriate sportspeople in Guatemala
Brazilian expatriate sportspeople in Moldova
Sportspeople from Paraná (state)